Michael Leonard Davis (April 15, 1956 – April 25, 2021) was an American professional football player who was a safety in the National Football League (NFL).

College career
Davis played college football at the University of Colorado, where was part of a team that won the 1976 Big 8 Championship.  He was a 1976 NEA All American.

Professional career
Davis played for the National Football League's Oakland Raiders between 1978 and 1985. During that time he was a starter on the Raiders Super Bowl XV and Super Bowl XVIII winning teams. Davis is best known for making a key interception at the end of the 1980 AFC Conference playoff game with the Cleveland Browns, in a play known as Red Right 88. He finished his career with the San Diego Chargers in 1987. Davis' superb play was often overlooked by fans and reporters because he rarely made interceptions (partly because the Raiders didn't often need him to help their star cornerbacks, partly because he wasn't a good pass-catcher and dropped a number of potential picks during his career) and because advanced statistics that would have shown what a truly great safety he was did not exist when he played.

Personal life
Davis died at age 65 on April 25, 2021.

References

External links
NFL.com player page

1956 births
2021 deaths
Players of American football from Berkeley, California
American football safeties
Colorado Buffaloes football players
Oakland Raiders players
Los Angeles Raiders players
San Diego Chargers players